Jack Stuart Easter (21 November 1907 – 1 January 1979) was an Australian politician who represented the National Party in the Parliament of New South Wales.

He was educated at Ardingly College and at Regent Street Polytechnic. He was a company director who during his career served as alderman and mayor of Ballina, and also served as Chairman of Richmond River County Council, and delegate to Northern Rivers County Council and to Far North Coast Weeds Council.

He served as an Australian Country Party (N.S.W.) member for Lismore in the New South Wales Legislative Assembly between 1953 and 1959. After being re-elected at the 1959 New South Wales state election by a margin of two votes, Easter's win was disputed in the Court of Disputed Returns where the election was pronounced void, leading to a subsequent by-election. He lost the by-election to the Labor Party's Keith Compton after the Australian Country Party endorsed a second candidate.

References

 

1907 births
1979 deaths
People educated at Ardingly College
Alumni of the University of Westminster
Members of the New South Wales Legislative Assembly
National Party of Australia members of the Parliament of New South Wales
20th-century Australian politicians